The 2022 World Junior Short Track Speed Skating Championships took place between 4 and 6 March 2022 in Hala Olivia in Gdańsk, Poland.

On 1 March 2022 following the IOC recommendation the ISU Council basedof the ISU Constitution, agreed that with immediate effect and until further notice, no skaters belonging to the ISU Members in Russia and Belarus shall be invited or allowed to participate in International ice skating competitions including ISU championships and other ISU events.

Schedule 
All times are CET (UTC+01:00).

Medal summary

Medal table

Medalists

Men

Women

Participants 
A total of 153 competitors and 14 substitutes from the national teams of the following 31 countries was registered to compete at 2022 World Junior Short Track Speed Skating Championships.

  (1)
  (1)
  (4)
  (1)
  (6)
  (8)
  (3)
  (3)
  (6)
  (8)
  (2)
  (8)
  (8)
  (8)
  (6)
  (3)
  (1)
  (8)
  (7)
  (1)
  (8)
  (1)
  (4)
  (3)
  (4)
  (8)
  (1)
  (2)
  (8)
  (2)
  (8)

References

External links 
 Results
 Results book

World Junior Short Track Speed Skating Championships
World Junior Short Track Speed Skating Championships
World Junior Short Track Speed Skating Championships
World Junior Short Track Speed Skating Championships
World Junior Short Track Speed Skating Championships
World Junior Short Track Speed Skating Championships
World Junior Short Track Speed Skating Championships